Herminia is a genus of litter moths of the family Erebidae. The genus was described by Pierre André Latreille in 1802. It was treated as a synonym for Polypogon for some time.

Species
 Herminia grisealis Denis & Schiffermüller, 1775 - small fan-foot
 Herminia tarsicrinalis Knoch, 1782 - shaded fan-foot
 Herminia tarsipennalis Treitschke, 1835 - fan-foot
 Herminia tenuialis Rebel, 1899
 Herminia vermiculata (Leech, 1900)

References

Herminiinae
Moth genera